Leoš Petrovský (born 5 January 1993) is a Czech handball player for Bergischer HC and the Czech national team.

He participated at the 2015 World Men's Handball Championship in Qatar.

References

External links

1993 births
Living people
Czech male handball players
People from Frýdek-Místek
Expatriate handball players in Poland
Czech expatriate sportspeople in Germany
Czech expatriate sportspeople in Poland
Handball-Bundesliga players
Sportspeople from the Moravian-Silesian Region